Sefid Qoleh Zaruni (also Romanized as Sefīd Qoleh Ẕarūnī; also known as Morādʿal) is a village in Kuhdasht-e Shomali Rural District, in the Central District of Kuhdasht County, Lorestan Province, Iran. At the 2006 census, its population was 107, in 22 families.

References 

Towns and villages in Kuhdasht County